Marcus Sylvegård is a Swedish ice hockey ice hockey player. He is currently playing with Malmö Redhawks of the Swedish Hockey League.

He was part of the winning Växjö Lakers side of the 2020-21 SHL campaign.

Career statistics

References

External links

1999 births
Living people
Malmö Redhawks players
Växjö Lakers players
People from Vellinge Municipality
Swedish ice hockey right wingers
Sportspeople from Skåne County